The 28th Torino Film Festival was held in 2010 in Turin, Italy. The festival jury included Marco Bellocchio, Barbora Bobuľová, Michel Ciment, Helmut Grasser and Joe R. Lansdale.

Films in competition
The Bang Bang Club (Steven Silver)
Blessed Events (Isabelle Stever)
Four Lions (Chris Morris)
Henry (Alessandro Piva)
The Infidel (Josh Appignanesi)
It's Your Fault (Por tu culpa) (Anahí Berneri)
Last Chestnuts (Ye Zhao)
Marimbas From Hell (Julio Hernández Cordón)
Men Standing (Jérémy Gravayat)
Portrait of a Fighter as a Young Man (Constantin Popescu)
Small Town Murder Songs (Ed Gass-Donnelly)
Soulboy (Shimmy Marcus)
Vampires (Vincent Lannoo)
Vital Signs (Les Signes Vitaux) (Sophie Deraspe)
White Irish Drinkers (John Gray)
Winter's Bone (Debra Granik)

Awards
Best Film:
Winter's Bone (Debra Granik)
Jury Special Prize:
Vital Signs (Sophie Deraspe)
Las Marimbas del Infierno (Julio Hernández Cordón)
Best Actress:
Jennifer Lawrence (Winter's Bone)
Érica Rivas (Por Tu Culpa)
Best Actor:
Omid Djalili (The Infidel)
Audience Award:
Henry (Alessandro Piva)
FIPRESCI Award:
Small Town Murder Songs (Ed Gass-Donnelly)

External links

Torino
Torino
Torino
Torino Film Festival